This is a list of settlements in the Evros regional unit, Greece:

 Aisymi
 Alepochori
 Alexandroupoli
 Amorio
 Ampelakia
 Antheia
 Ardani
 Arzos
 Asimenio
 Asproneri
 Asvestades
 Avas
 Chandras
 Dadia
 Didymoteicho
 Dikaia
 Doriko
 Doriskos
 Doxa
 Elafochori
 Elaia
 Ellinochori
 Feres
 Fylakio
 Fylakto
 Isaakio
 Karoti
 Kastanies
 Kavisos
 Kavyli
 Kirki
 Komara
 Kornofolea
 Koufovouno
 Kyani
 Kyprinos
 Kyriaki
 Ladi
 Lagyna
 Lavara
 Lefkimmi
 Loutros
 Lykofos
 Lyra
 Makri
 Mandra
 Mani
 Marasia
 Mavrokklisi
 Megali Doxipara
 Metaxades
 Mikro Dereio
 Milia
 Nea Vyssa
 Neo Cheimonio
 Neochori
 Nipsa
 Orestiada
 Ormenio
 Paliouri
 Pentalofos
 Peplos
 Petrades
 Petrota
 Plati
 Poimeniko
 Prangio
 Protokklisi
 Provatonas
 Ptelea
 Pylaia
 Pythio
 Rigio
 Rizia
 Sitochori
 Sofiko
 Soufli
 Spilaio
 Sterna 
 Sykorrachi
 Therapeio 
 Thourio
 Trifylli
 Tychero 
 Valtos
 Vrysika
 Zoni

By municipality

Samothrace (no subdivisions)

Abandoned villages
Agrafiotika, Aliki, Amfithea, Amygdalia, Apidochori, Archondiko, Asia, Chaldini, Chandakas, Chloi, Daskaleio, Delitio, Drepano, Drymos, Dymi, Fere Kalyva, Gavria, Iana, Katsika, Kissos, Kitrinopetra, Kliso, Ktima, Mavropetra, Megali Kavissos, Melopetra, Mikraki, Nea Vrysi, Nefeli, Ourania, Palaistra, Patara, Pessani, Polyvlasto, Potamos, Profitis Ilias, Pyrolithos, Samaras, Sanidochori, Sarpidonia, Spano, Tarsio, Theiafi, Treis Myloi, Triada, Tsaliki, Vafeio, Vergi, Vyrini, Xirodendro, Yalia.

See also

List of towns and villages in Greece

Evros